USS N-3 (SS-55) was a N-class coastal defense submarine of the United States Navy.  Her keel was laid down on 31 July 1915 by the Seattle Construction and Drydock Company. She was launched on 21 February 1917 sponsored by Miss Bertha Coontz, daughter of the commandant of Puget Sound Navy Yard, Captain Robert Coontz, and commissioned on 26 September 1917 with Lieutenant William R. Munroe in command. N-3 was the last submarine constructed in Seattle.

Service history
The three submarines arrived at New London, Connecticut, on 7 February 1918. From here, N-3 patrolled along the New England coast and off Long Island. On 23 July, a British steamer mistook N-3 as a German U-boat and fired on her at a range of only . Although hit by a six-inch shell, the submarine suffered only slight damage and after repairs at sea, was able to proceed to New York Navy Yard under her own power. Following permanent repairs, N-3 returned to the Submarine School, New London for patrol and training duty through 1920.

Departing New London on 1 June 1921, N-3 sailed for Toledo, Ohio. One of the first submarines to navigate the St. Lawrence River and the Great Lakes, she put in at Halifax, Nova Scotia, Montreal, Quebec, and Port Dalhousie before arriving Toledo, Ohio, on 25 June. She remained there for 11 days, open to the public for inspection. Departing on 6 July, she returned to New London, arriving on 20 July, and from there cruised along the East Coast from Halifax to Philadelphia, Pennsylvania, conducting training cruises. Departing New London, she sailed for the Philadelphia Navy Yard, where she decommissioned on 30 April 1926. She was struck from the Naval Vessel Register on 18 December 1930 and was scrapped in mid-1931.

References

External links
 

United States N-class submarines
World War I submarines of the United States
Ships built in Seattle
1917 ships
International maritime incidents
Friendly fire incidents of World War I
Maritime incidents in 1918